Bradfield was a rural district in Berkshire, England, from 1894 to 1974.

It was created under the Local Government Act 1894 from the Bradfield rural sanitary district, except the three parishes in Oxfordshire which formed the Goring Rural District.

The district contained the following civil parishes during its existence:

In 1974 Bradfield Rural District merged with other districts to form a new Newbury district of Berkshire under the Local Government Act 1972. Since 1998 this has been the West Berkshire unitary authority.

References

Districts of England created by the Local Government Act 1894
Districts of England abolished by the Local Government Act 1972
Former districts of Berkshire
Rural districts of England